Sorority House Massacre is a 1986 American slasher film written and directed by Carol Frank. The film follows a sorority pledge who experiences deja vu in the sorority house when a murderer begins killing the residents over Memorial Day weekend. The second film in the Massacre franchise, in the same realm as the Slumber Party Massacre trilogy, as a spin-off, like its predecessors, it was entirely written and directed by women.

Sorority House Massacre received a largely negative reception on release, often criticized for being "too similar" to Halloween (1978), while it has been retrospectively praised as a "feminist masterpiece".

It was followed by two sequels, Sorority House Massacre II and Sorority House Massacre III: Hard to Die (both 1990), directed by Jim Wynorski.

Plot
When Beth (Angela O'Neill) is a little girl, her brother Bobby (John C. Russell) kills her whole family and attempts to kill her. When he is caught, he is committed, and she grows up with a new family. Years later, Beth goes to college, where she joins a sorority. Due to a memory block, she doesn't remember that the sorority house was her childhood home, however her memory soon starts to return. Meanwhile, Bobby senses her presence in the house and escapes the mental asylum so he can finish the job he was unable to complete. He steals a hunting knife in a hardware shop killing the elderly owner.

As Beth settles into the sorority, many of the girls leave for the weekend, leaving only her, Linda (Wendy Martel), Sara (Pamela Ross) and Tracy (Nicole Rio) in the house. As the girls enjoy having the house to themselves, Craig (Joe Nassi), Andy (Marcus Vaughter) and John (Vinnie Bilancio) come over. John tells the story of Beth's family murders, scaring her. She goes to bed and has a nightmare about her brother, becoming more scared. She remembers her brother hiding a knife in the fireplace, and when the group investigate, they find the knife. Realizing the time, Andy leaves in a rush, only to be confronted by Bobby and stabbed to death. Linda hypnotizes Beth, who recalls Bobby attacking her. Afterwards, Tracy and Craig go outside to the tipi they set up earlier, while Linda and Sara go to bed. Bobby attacks Tracy and Craig, shredding the tipi with his knife. As they try to escape, Tracy is stabbed to death. Craig runs into the house and alerts Linda and Sara who try to phone the police but find the lines have been cut. They attempt to warn Beth and John, but both have fallen asleep. As Bobby approaches them, Beth wakes and runs upstairs to the others, but John is murdered.

The survivors barricade themselves inside a room, before Craig escapes out the window down a safety ladder. While he holds it steady for Linda to climb down, Bobby stabs Craig to death before climbing up the ladder for Linda. Linda manages to make it back through the window and the others remove the ladder, making Bobby fall. Thinking he is dead, the girls try to escape the house but upon discovering he is still alive barricade themselves back into the room. However, Bobby comes in through the window and they flee outside. They once more encounter Bobby, who manages to repeatedly stab Sara. Meanwhile, Bobby's search party realize he will have gone to his old house and send the police there.

Beth and Linda run down into the basement where Beth finally realizes what happened to her when she was younger. When Bobby once more attacks them, the girls run upstairs. Bobby corners Beth but Linda manages to hit him with a shovel. Thinking he is dead, they begin to leave the house, but Bobby stabs Linda before attacking Beth who over powers him and stabs him in the neck, killing him. The police arrive. Beth is taken to the hospital where she continues to have nightmares about her brother.

Cast
Angela O'Neill as Laura 'Beth' Henkel
Wendy Martel as Linda Dawn Grant 
Pamela Ross as Sara Mason
Nicole Rio as Tracy
John C. Russell as Bobby Henkel
Marcus Vaughter as Andy
Vinnie Bilancio as John Raden Minor
Joe Nassi as Craig
Ivory Berry as Suzanne 'Susie'
Mary Anne as Mrs. Lawrence
Susan Bollman as Cindy
Gillian Frank as Dr. Lindsey
Joseph Mansier as Technician
Axel Roberts as Larry Bronkowski
Fitzhough Huston as Detective Gilbert
Patrick Fahey as Officer Kreuger 
Bob Moore as Officer Voorhies

Release
The film was given a limited release theatrically in the United States by Concorde Pictures in October 1986. The film was released on VHS the following year by Warner Home Video.

The film has been released twice on DVD in the United States by New Concorde Home Entertainment; once as a single film edition in 2000 and as a double feature release alongside sequel Sorority House Massacre II in 2003. Both releases are currently out of print. The film was released on re-mastered Blu-ray in a limited 1,200 copy run through Scorpion Releasing in November 2014.

References

External links

1986 horror films
1986 films
American slasher films
Sorority House Massacre 01
Films about fraternities and sororities
Sororicide in fiction
Films about fratricide and sororicide
Massacre (franchise)
1986 directorial debut films
1980s English-language films
1980s American films